Cyathochaeta equitans is a sedge of the family Cyperaceae that is native to Australia.

The plant blooms between January and February producing brown flowers.

In Western Australia it is found mostly along the coast in the Wheatbelt, Peel, South West, Great Southern and Goldfields-Esperance regions where it grows in sandy soils.

It was first described in 1997 by Karen Wilson.

References

Plants described in 1997
Flora of Western Australia
equitans
Taxa named by Karen Louise Wilson